Final league standings for the 1926-27 St. Louis Soccer League.

League standings

 Chicago Sparta withdrew after four games.

Top Goal Scorers

External links
St. Louis Soccer Leagues (RSSSF)
The Year in American Soccer - 1927

References

1926-27
1926–27 domestic association football leagues
1926–27 in American soccer
St Louis Soccer
St Louis Soccer